Marcus Simmons may refer to:

 Marcus Simmons (basketball) (born 1988) American basketball player
 Marcus Simmons (soccer) (born 2000), Canadian soccer player